Metarbelodes umtaliana is a moth in the family Cossidae. It is found in Kenya and Zimbabwe.

References

Metarbelinae
Moths described in 1901